Erik Selin (born 1967) is a Swedish billionaire property developer, and the CEO and controlling owner of Fastighets AB Balder.

Selin is the chairman of Collector Credit AB, SATO Oyj, and Collector AB. Selin is divorced, and lives in Gothenburg, Sweden.

References 

1967 births
Living people
People from Gothenburg
Swedish businesspeople
Swedish billionaires